This is a summary of the year 2019 in British music.

Events 
3 January – The Royal College of Organists announces Hans Fagius and Nicolas Kynaston as the recipients of the RCO Medal for 2019.
10 January – The Brodsky Quartet announces the appointment of Gina McCormack as its new violinist, to replace the departing Daniel Rowland.
17 January – The Ernst von Siemens Music Foundation announces Rebecca Saunders as the recipient of the Ernst von Siemens Musikpreis 2019, the second woman and the first female composer ever to be honoured with the award.
21 January – The Barbican Centre, London Symphony Orchestra, and Guildhall School of Music and Drama jointly unveil initial designs for the proposed privately-funded centre for music in the City of London.
24 January – Tasmin Little announces her intention to retire from classical music performance in the summer of 2020.
25 January
 The BBC Symphony Orchestra announces the appointment of Dalia Stasevska as its next principal guest conductor, the first woman to be named to the post and the second female conductor ever to be given a titled post with a BBC orchestra.
 The Ulster Orchestra announces the appointment of Daniele Rustioni as its next chief conductor, effective September 2019.
 The city of Schwäbisch Gmünd announces John Rutter as the recipient of the Preis der Europäischen Kirchenmusik 2019.
 20 February – Future Talent announces Sheku Kanneh-Mason as its newest Ambassador.
 4 March – Scala Radio, a new classical radio station, begins transmission.
 8 March 
 A British Phonographic Industry report indicates that with respect to music provision, state schools have seen a 21% decrease over the past 5 years, compared to a net increase of 7% in independent schools during the same period.
 Birmingham Contemporary Music Group announces the appointment of Seb Huckle as its new executive director.
 29–31 March – The BBC Radio 6 Music Festival takes place in Liverpool.
 17 April
 English National Opera announces the resignation of Daniel Kramer as its artistic director, effective at the end of July 2019.
 The Court of Appeal unanimously upholds the earlier ruling by the High Court of Justice in the case of Christopher Goldscheider v. Royal Opera House Covent Garden Foundation, in favour of Goldscheider.
 22 April – The Lark Ascending by Ralph Vaughan Williams regains its position at number 1 in the Classic FM Top 300, revealed over the Easter weekend.
 25 April – The Development Management Sub-Committee of the City of Edinburgh Council approves plans for the construction of Dunard Centre, the first purpose-built music and performance venue in Edinburgh in over 100 years.
 29 April – The PRS Foundation announces that Vanessa Reed is to stand down as its executive director, effective with the summer of 2019.
 7 May – BBC Radio 3 announces the musicians for its New Generation Artists scheme from 2019-21:
 Eric Lu, piano
 Alexander Gadjiev, piano
 Timothy Ridout, viola
 Consone Quartet
 Johan Dalene, violin
 Rob Luft, jazz guitar
 Ema Nikoslovska, mezzo-soprano
 10 May – The Philharmonia Orchestra announces that Helen Sprott is to stand down as its managing director.
 22 May
 The Philharmonia Orchestra announces the appointment of Santtu-Matias Rouvali as its next principal conductor, effective with the 2021-2022 season, with an initial contract of 5 years.
 The Benedetti Foundation announces the appointment of Michael Garvey as its first-ever executive director.
 The BBC National Orchestra of Wales (BBC NOW) announces that Michael Garvey is to stand down as director of the BBC NOW and the BBC National Chorus of Wales.
 7 June
 Queen's Birthday Honours:
 Stephen Cleobury, Ian Stoutzker, and David Pountney are each made a Knight Bachelor.
 Jonathan Dove, Joanna MacGregor, Mitch Murray and Mark Padmore are each made a Commander of the Order of British Empire.
 Elvis Costello, Kathryn Harries, Feargal Sharkey and Robin Ticciati are each made an Officer of the Order of the British Empire.
 Mary Bevan, Sophie Bevan, Alfie Boe, Jacqui Dankworth, Andy Heath, Anna Meredith, and Timothy Reynish are each made a Member of the Order of the British Empire.
 14–16 June – Download Festival 2019 takes place at Donington Park in Leicestershire. The main stage is headlined by Def Leppard, Slipknot and Tool, the Zippo encore stage by Rob Zombie, Halestorm and Slayer (in their final UK appearance), the Avalanche stage by Me First and the Gimme Gimmes, Simple Creatures and Enter Shikari, and the Dogtooth stage by At the Gates, Carcass and Municipal Waste.
 17 June – The Royal Philharmonic Society (RPS) announces the appointments of Alexander Goehr and Sir David Pountney as honorary members of the RPS.
 22 June – The BBC Cardiff Singer of the World 2019 competition results are announced:
 Main Prize – Andrei Kymach
 Song Prize – Mingjie Lei
 Audience Prize – Katie Bray
 24 June – Opera North announces the appointment of Garry Walker as its next music director, effective with the 2020-21 season.
 26 June – Opera Rara announces the appointment of Carlo Rizzi as its next artistic director, effective June 2020.
 19 July – Karina Canellakis conducts the First Night of the Proms at the Royal Albert Hall, the first female conductor ever to conduct the First Night.
 25 July – The London Philharmonic Orchestra announces the appointment of Edward Gardner as its next principal conductor, effective with the 2021-22 season, with an initial contract of 5 years.
 3 September – At the Proms, Bernard Haitink conducts his 90th and final Prom, with the Vienna Philharmonic Orchestra and pianist Emanuel Ax.
 11 September – The BBC National Orchestra of Wales announces the appointment of Ryan Bancroft as its next principal conductor, effective with the 2020-21 season, with an initial contract of 3 years.
 16 September
 The BBC announces the appointment of Lisa Tregale as the new Director of the BBC National Orchestra of Wales and the BBC National Chorus of Wales, effective in 2020.  Tregale is the first woman to be named to the post.
 Wigmore Hall awards Iestyn Davies the Wigmore Medal, after a concert at Wigmore Hall on his 40th birthday.
 5 October – Lucia Lucas becomes the first transgender singer to perform with the English National Opera in London.
 8 October – English National Opera announces the appointment of Annilese Miskimmon as its next artistic director, effective September 2020.
 8 November – The Royal Albert Hall announces a new 5-year partnership with the Royal Philharmonic Orchestra as its new associate orchestra for year-round orchestral programmes.
 9 December – The Yehudi Menuhin School announces the appointment of Tasmin Little as its new co-president.
 27 December – UK New Year's Honours 2020:
 Sir Elton John is made a Member of the Order of the Companions of Honour.
 Olivia Newton-John is made a Dame Commander of the Order of the British Empire.
 Humphrey Burton is made a Knight Bachelor.
 Timothy Walker and Errollyn Wallen are each made a Commander of the Order of British Empire.
 Judith Bingham, Nicola Killean, Gary Lightbody and Roger Taylor are each made an Officer of the Order of the British Empire.
 Helen Grime, Sheku Kanneh-Mason, and Charles Kennard are each made a Member of the Order of the British Empire.

Television programmes 

1 January – Jools' Annual Hootenanny features Marc Almond, George Ezra, Junior Giscombe, Jess Glynne and others.
24 February – Pappano's Greatest Arias, presented by Antonio Pappano
1 March – Say Hello, Wave Goodbye, documentary about Soft Cell
14 April – Janet Baker in her own words, documentary about Janet Baker
7 September – Strictly Come Dancing 2019 series, introducing new judge Motsi Mabuse. 
12 October 
The X Factor: Celebrity; competitors include Brendan Cole, Martin Bashir and Hayley Hasselhoff The series is won by Megan McKenna, with Max and Harvey second and Jenny Ryan third.
Mark Ronson: From the Heart (BBC4 documentary)
10 December – Lucy Worsley's Christmas Carol Odyssey (BBC4 documentary)

Artists and groups

Reformed 

Doves
The Futureheads
Goodbye Mr Mackenzie
JLS
Lighthouse Family
McFly
Monaco
The Power Station
Roxy Music
Shakespears Sister
Sugababes (original line up)
Supergrass

Disbanded 
Arms Race
Estrons
The Good, the Bad & the Queen
Mallory Knox
Otherkin
The Searchers
Spandau Ballet
The Spook School
Superfood

Classical works 
 Thomas Adès – Concerto for Piano and Orchestra
 Sally Beamish – Nine Fragments (for string quartet)
 Michael Berkeley – Epitaphs of War
 Sir Harrison Birtwistle – Duet for 8 Strings (for viola and cello)
 Mark David Boden – Descent
 Jay Capperauld – Egalitair
 John Casken – Madonna of Silence (Trombone Concerto)
 Jonathan Dove
 Accordion Concerto ('Northern Lights')
 We Are One Fire
 David Fennessy - The Ground (commissioned by BBC; premièred on 12 January at Glasgow City Hall
 Helen Grime – Percussion Concerto
 Gavin Higgins – Book of Miracles (Trombone Concerto)
 Robin Holloway – Phaeton’s Journey: Son of the Sun (Trumpet Concerto)
 Dani Howard – Gates of Spring
 Emily Howard (music) and Michael Symmons Roberts (text) – The Anvil - An elegy for Peterloo
 Daniel Kidane – Woke
 John Woolrich – A Book of Inventions
 Nicholas Korth – Harmoniae Naturales VI
 Sir James MacMillan – Symphony No 5 ('Le grand Inconnu') 
 Grace-Evangeline Mason – Midnight Spires
 Colin Matthews – Octet
 Tom Poster – The Turning Year
 André Previn and Tom Stoppard – Penelope
 Joby Talbot – A Sheen of Dew on Flowers
 Mark-Anthony Turnage – Massarosa (for bassoon and string quartet)
 Huw Watkins – The Moon
 Ryan Wigglesworth – Piano Concerto
 Scott Wilson – À Mezza Voce
 John Woolrich – A Book of Inventions

Opera 
 Iain Bell and Mark Campbell – Stonewall
 Iain Bell and Emma Jenkins – The Women of Whitechapel
 Gavin Higgins and Francesca Simon – The Monstrous Child
 Dani Howard (music), Zoe Palmer and Rebecca Hurst (libretto) – Robin Hood
 Stuart MacRae and Louise Welsh – Anthropocene
 Gabriel Prokofiev and David Pountney – Elizabetta
 Philip Venables and Ted Huffman – Denis & Katya

Musical theatre 
Only Fools and Horses The Musical, by Paul Whitehouse and Jim Sullivan, with additional music by Chas Hodges and John Sullivan

Musical films 
Blinded by the Light, starring Hayley Atwell and Kulvinder Ghir, with music by Bruce Springsteen.
Cats, starring James Corden, Idris Elba, Ian McKellen and Judi Dench, with music by Andrew Lloyd Webber, due for release on 20 December.
Rocketman, starring Taron Egerton, produced by Elton John, David Furnish and Matthew Vaughn
Yesterday, starring Himesh Patel and Ed Sheeran, with songs by Paul McCartney and John Lennon

Film scores and incidental music

Film 
Soumik Datta - Around India with a Movie Camera
Steven Price - Wonder Park
Vik Sharma & Graham Coxon - Fighting with My Family

Television 
David Arnold - Good Omens
Ewen Henderson - Sanditon
Dominik Scherrer - The Widow

British music awards 
Brit Awards – see 2019 Brit Awards

Charts and sales

Number-one singles 
The singles chart includes a proportion for streaming.

Number-one albums 
The albums chart includes a proportion for streaming.

Number-one compilation albums

Top singles of the year 
This chart was published by the Official Charts Company on 1 January 2020

Best-selling albums

Deaths 

 1 January – Dean Ford, singer, songwriter and musician with Marmalade, 72 (Parkinson's disease)
 3 January – Donald Froud, orchestral administrator and French horn player, and first general manager of the Ulster Orchestra, 86
 7 January – John Joubert, South Africa-born composer, 91
 19 January – Ted McKenna, drummer (The Sensational Alex Harvey Band), 68 (cerebral haemorrhage)
 28 January – Noel Rawsthorne, organist, 89
 6 February – Gerald English, tenor, 93
 9 February – Cadet, rapper, 28 (car accident)
 25 February – Mark Hollis, 64, singer and songwriter (Talk Talk) (death reported on this date)
 26 February – Andy Anderson, 68, rock drummer (cancer)
 28 February – André Previn KBE, conductor (past principal conductor of the London Symphony Orchestra and music director of the Royal Philharmonic Orchestra), composer, and pianist, 89
 1 March – Paul Williams, singer, 78
 3 March – Peter Hurford, organist and composer, 88
 4 March – Keith Flint, singer, musician (The Prodigy), 49
 6 March – Grayston Burgess, countertenor and conductor, 86
 26 March – Ranking Roger, ska musician, 56 (cancer)
 27 March – Stephen Fitzpatrick, singer, musician (Her's), 24 (road accident)
 8 April – Sue Revill, classical record company financial administrator, 63
 15 April – Les Reed, songwriter, 83
 22 April – Heather Harper, soprano, 88
 27 April – Joseph Ward, 76, English tenor
 30 April – Boon Gould, English musician (Level 42), 64.
 28 May – Ralph Murphy, 75, British-born Canadian country musician, cancer.
 3 July – Alan Rogan, 68, English guitar technician (The Who), cancer.
 16 July – Johnny Clegg, 66, British-born South African singer and musician (Juluka, Savuka), pancreatic cancer.
 30 July – Lol Mason, 69, English singer (City Boy, The Maisonettes).
 1 August – Ian Gibbons, 67, English keyboardist (The Kinks), bladder cancer.
 3 August – Joe Longthorne, 64, English singer and entertainer, throat cancer.
 11 August – Freddy Bannister, 84, English rock concert promoter, cancer.
 20 August - Timmy Walsh, English guitarist, (Northside), 51, suicide (death announced in 2020).
 25 August – Jonathan Goldstein, 50, English composer, plane crash.
 14 September – Julian Piper, 72, English blues guitarist.
 18 September – Tony Mills, 57, English rock singer (Shy, TNT), pancreatic cancer.
 19 September – Larry Wallis, 70, English musician (Pink Fairies, Motörhead).
 6 October – Ginger Baker, 80, English drummer (Cream, Blind Faith, Ginger Baker's Air Force).
 8 October – Molly Duncan, 74, saxophonist (Average White Band), cancer.
 22 November – Sir Stephen Cleobury, 70, English organist, director of the Choir of King's College, Cambridge, since 1982 
 24 November – Colin Mawby, 83, English organist, choral conductor and composer
 27 November – Sir Jonathan Miller, British theatre and opera director, satirist, and physician, 85
 28 November – Christopher Finzi, British conductor and son of Gerald Finzi, 85
 7 December – Simon Streatfeild, 90, conductor and violist
 29 December 
 Susanne Beer, German-born orchestral cellist resident in the United Kingdom and principal cello of the London Philharmonic Orchestra, 52
 Neil Innes, 75, singer, musician, writer (Bonzo Dog Doo-Dah Band), (The Rutles)

See also 
 2019 in British radio
 2019 in British television
 2019 in the United Kingdom

References

Notes

Citations 

 
2019